John McKittrick Redmond (September 3, 1910 – July 27, 1968) was a professional baseball player.  He was a catcher for one season (1935) with the Washington Senators.  For his career, he compiled a .176 batting average in 34 at-bats, with one home run and seven runs batted in.

An alumnus of the University of Arizona, he was born in Florence, Arizona and died in Garland, Texas at the age of 57.

External links

1910 births
1968 deaths
Washington Senators (1901–1960) players
Major League Baseball catchers
Baseball players from Arizona
Bartlesville Broncos players
Cedar Rapids Bunnies players
Peoria Tractors players
Rock Island Islanders players
Birmingham Barons players
Albany Senators players
Jacksonville Tars players
Jersey City Giants players
New Orleans Pelicans (baseball) players
Baltimore Orioles (IL) players
Buffalo Bisons (minor league) players
Portland Beavers players
Arizona Wildcats baseball players